Limestone City is an unincorporated community in Clark County, in the U.S. state of Ohio.

History
Limestone City was platted in 1886, and named for the local limestone-quarrying industry.

References

Unincorporated communities in Clark County, Ohio
1886 establishments in Ohio
Populated places established in 1886
Unincorporated communities in Ohio